Amber Hunt may refer to:

 Amber Hunt (comics), a fictional character from Malibu Comics' Exiles comic book series
 Amber Hunt (journalist), journalist and true crime author